Encephalartos relictus is a species of cycad in Eswatini.

Description
It is a cycad with an arborescent habit, with a stem up to 2.5 m tall and 40-45 cm in diameter, with secondary stems originating from basal suckers. [3]
The leaves, pinnate, of a bluish-green color, are 1–2 m long, supported by a petiole about 15 cm long, and composed of numerous pairs of lanceolate, coriaceous leaflets, arranged on the rachis with an angle of about 40°, long up to 20–25 cm, with entire margin and a pungent.
It is a dioecious species, of which, however, only male specimens are known which have from 1 to 3 sub-conical cones, about 20–24 cm long and 12–15 cm broad, of greenish-yellow sarcotesta.

References

relictus